Bajice is a village in the municipality of Cetinje, Montenegro.

Demographics
According to the 2011 census, its population was 781.

References

Populated places in Cetinje Municipality